

References 

Las Vegas Valley
Convention centers